Anger Management is an American comedy series that premiered on FX on June 28, 2012. The series is based on the 2003 film of the same name and stars Charlie Sheen in a role very loosely similar to the one originated by Jack Nicholson from the film. A total of 100 episodes were broadcast over two seasons.

Series overview

Episodes

Season 1 (2012)

Season 2 (2013–14)
Season 2 debuted on FX on January 17, 2013. In an effort to boost the show's sagging Season 2 ratings, FX announced in May that four episodes (two of them first-run) would air on FX's parent network Fox on Monday nights in June, starting June 3.

In June 2013, a press release for an episode titled "Charlie and Kate Have Sex for Science" was released stating that the episode was set to air on June 27, 2013, as the twenty-sixth episode of the season. Following the aftermath of Selma Blair's dismissal from the series, the planned broadcast was canceled and replaced with "Charlie and the Hot Nerd" - the first episode produced without Blair. The status of "Charlie and Kate Have Sex for Science" is unknown as all episodes with production codes up to, and including, 1040 (Blair's final episode) have aired. An episode with a similar title, but with different storylines, named "Charlie Does It For Science" aired on December 5, 2013.

On November 7, 2014, FX announced that the series would end after its 100th episode airs on December 22, 2014.

References

External links
 
 

Anger Management